Ban Aen is a tambon (subdistrict) of Doi Tao District, in Chiang Mai Province, Thailand. In 2019 it had a total population of 2,556 people.

Geography 
There is a dam and reservoir in the vicinity.

Administration

Central administration
The tambon is subdivided into 4 administrative villages (muban).

Local administration
The whole area of the subdistrict is covered by the subdistrict administrative organization (SAO) Ban Aen (องค์การบริหารส่วนตำบลบ้านแอ่น).

References

External links
Thaitambon.com on Ban Aen

Tambon of Chiang Mai province
Populated places in Chiang Mai province